Lee Maiyani Kinyanjui is a Kenyan politician. He is the second and immediate former governor  for Nakuru County.

Early years and education
He is a  47-year-old graduate of Kenyatta University where he graduated in literature and later pursued a master's degree in business administration at the University of Nairobi.

Career 
Lee Kinyanjui belongs to the Jubilee Party and was elected to represent the Nakuru Town Constituency in the National Assembly of Kenya since the 2007 Kenyan parliamentary election. In 2013, he unsuccessfully vied for the Nakuru gubernatorial seat, losing to Kinuthia Mbugua. He vied for the second time, for the same seat, in 2017, trouncing Governor Kinuthia Mbugua in Jubilee Party primaries. In August, Lee Kinyanjui was elected as the Nakuru Governor, effectively becoming the second governor of the county.  He served as the Assistant Minister for roads and later as the first chairperson of the National Transport and Safety Authority (NTSA). During his tenure at NTSA, he oversaw digitisation of driving licences and logbook acquisition by introducing TIMS. As Nakuru Governor, Kinyanjui has initiated Mega projects including construction of Level 4 hospitals across Nakuru County, upgrade of 73-year-old Afraha Stadium, rehabilitation of rural roads through Boresha Barabara program and upgrade of Lanet Airstrip into an international airport. Kinyanjui is also pushed for Nakuru Municipality into a city, which it is currently.

References

Living people
Party of National Unity (Kenya) politicians
Members of the National Assembly (Kenya)
1973 births